The 2011 Honda Indy Toronto was the ninth round of the 2011 IndyCar Series season and took place on July 10, 2011, at the  Exhibition Place temporary street circuit in Toronto, Ontario, Canada. Dario Franchitti won the race, second was his teammate Scott Dixon, and Ryan Hunter-Reay came in third. Will Power took the 3 bonus points for winning pole and leading the most laps, but finished 24th after contact with championship rival Franchitti and Alex Tagliani.

Classification

Qualifying
 All cars were split into two groups of twelve, with the fastest six from each group going through to the "top 12" session. In this session, the fastest six cars progressed to the "Firestone Fast Six." The fastest driver in the final session claimed pole, with the rest of the cars lining up in session order, regardless of qualifying times. (fast six from 1–6, top 12 from 7–12 and round 1 from 13–24, with group 1 drivers occupying the odd-numbered grid positions, and group 2 drivers occupying the even-numbered grid positions.

Race

Race summary
Early in the race controversy brewed on lap 57 when Dario Franchitti appeared to have intentionally collided into championship contender Will Power. Power spun out and was later hit by Alex Tagliani. Power wrecked enough that he was taken out of the race. In an interview Power called Franchitti "a dirty driver who mouths off about everybody." and was also critical of Tagliani calling him a "wanker."

A few moments following the wreck, the broadcasters announced that Franchitti was being issued a stop-and-go penalty for dirty driving & avoidable contact. However, it was later reported that the penalty was rescinded, outraging many fellow competitors and fans.

Meanwhile, Alex Tagliani was launched into the air and out of the race by Danica Patrick on the 72nd lap, while a close battle between Toronto natives James Hinchcliffe and Paul Tracy resulted in a flat tire for Hinchcliffe and a damaged front wing for Tracy.

Tracy's hopes for a hometown victory were wiped out after he bumped into Meira on the 45th lap, dropping the 42-year-old fan favorite three laps out of the pack to a 16th-place finish. James Hinchcliffe, meanwhile, finished 14th after being involved in a five-car collision when Andretti turned into Oriol Servia, resulting in a pileup that banged up Hinchcliffe, Servia and Charlie Kimball, and ended Mike Conway's day.

Patrick started 21st and was a nonfactor after a collision with Japan's Takuma Sato punctured one of her tires. She finished 19th, but could at least say she crossed the finish line.

Brazil's Tony Kanaan wasn't so fortunate nor was he a contender to win. He made an early exit after Australia's Ryan Briscoe clipped his back wheel rounding a corner, sending the Brazilian airborne into the wall just three laps after the start. Kanaan pointed at his head and yelled at Briscoe from the side of road as the Australian passed by his wrecked car.

Franchitti, meanwhile, dominated the race following the penalty's rescinding and took the lead from Graham Rahal with 15 laps to go and went on to win the controversial race. Fans booed and littered as Franchitti did donuts and drove into victory circle. When asked if there was a penalty that was rescinded, former race-car driver - now - race control director Al Unser Jr. said "There was never a penalty for the collision. There was never a penalized issue. We saw it as a simple racing accident...guys going for the same thing with one on the good end and one on the bad end, and emotions run high."

"I think it was a racing incident at best," Franchitti said in victory lane. "I don't think I'm known throughout the paddock as a driver who races people dirty. I will say, in his defense, had that happened to me today, I would have been steamed when I got out of the car too. Particularly if I'd crashed later in the race. ... I understand his anger, but hopefully when he watches the replay on television he'll realize it was a racing incident."''

References

Indy Toronto
Honda Indy Toronto
Honda Indy Toronto
Honda Indy Toronto
Honda Indy Toronto